Panchama Veda is a 1990 Indian Kannada-language romantic drama film written and directed by P. H. Vishwanath, in his first independent film as a director, while the dialogues are written by T. N. Seetharam. The film stars Ramesh Aravind, Sudharani and Ramakrishna. The film had musical score by Sangeetha Raja.

Upon release, the film was critically acclaimed and won multiple awards at the Karnataka State Film Awards for the year 1989–90. The film was remade in Telugu in 1997 as Rukmini.

Cast 
 Ramesh Aravind as Anand
 Sudharani as Rukmini
 Ramakrishna as Ravi
 Geetha
 Kashi
 Krishne Gowda as Sharabhayya
 Nagendra Shah
 Sujatha
 Geethanjali
 Sundaramma

Soundtrack 
The soundtrack of the film was composed by Sangeetha Raja.

Awards
 Karnataka State Film Awards 1989-90

 Best Actress - Sudharani
 Best Dialogue writer  - T. N. Seetharam
 Best Editing - Suresh Urs

References 

1990 films
1990s Kannada-language films
Indian romantic drama films
Kannada films remade in other languages
1990 romantic drama films
1990 directorial debut films
Films scored by S. P. Venkatesh